Bijar Basteh Sar (also Romanized as Bījār Basteh Sar) is a village in Layalestan Rural District, in the Central District of Lahijan County, Gilan Province, Iran. At the 2006 census, its population was 134, in 45 families.

References 

Populated places in Lahijan County